LZ-1 is one of the main roads on the island of Lanzarote in the Canary Islands. It leads north from the island's capital, Arrecife, ending at the island's northernmost town of Órzola.

Although most of the island's roads are owned by the island council (cabildo insular), roads of major importance such as the LZ-1 are owned by the Government of the Canary Islands.

References

Lanzarote
Roads in Spain